Battle of Vevi may refer to:
Battle of Vevi (1912), part of the First Balkan War
Battle of Vevi (1941), part of World War II